Alexander Prasanth is an Indian actor who primarily appears in Malayalam films. He made his debut through the 2002 movie Nammal.

Career
Prasanth began his career as an anchor of Crazy Records on Asianet. He made his acting debut in 2002 with Kamal's film Nammal. Prasanth later acted in several minor and character roles in more than 50 Malayalam movies. He did notable roles in the films like Ordinary, Best Actor, Oru Murai Vanthu Parthaya, Ira, The Great Father, Johny Johny Yes Appa etc. Movies like Action Hero Biju and Operation Java gave him a new lease on his film career. He made his Hindi film debut in 2019 for Rajkumar Gupta's India's Most Wanted, playing the role of South Indian Intelligence Officer Pillai. Prasanth wrote the dialogues for the film 'Velaikari irunthalum née en mohavalli'. He has also worked as the creative director for the film Race.

Personal life
He was born to Rev. K. P. Alexander and Leelamma. Prasanth completed his education from Mar Thoma College Tiruvalla and Kodaikanal Christian College. He is married to Sheeba, a professor at Mar Thoma College. Thiruvalla.

Filmography

All films are in Malayalam language unless otherwise noted.

As an anchor

References

External links
 

1979 births
Male actors in Hindi cinema
Indian male film actors
Living people
Male actors in Malayalam cinema
20th-century Indian male actors
Film people from Kerala